The three-year Carolingian Civil War culminated in the decisive Battle of Fontenoy, also called the Battle of Fontenoy-en-Puisaye, fought at Fontenoy, near Auxerre, on 25 June 841. The war was fought to decide the territorial inheritances of Charlemagne's grandsonsthe division of the Carolingian Empire among the three surviving sons of Louis the Pious. Despite Louis' provisions for succession, war broke out between his sons and nephews. The battle has been described as a major defeat for the allied forces of Lothair I of Italy and Pepin II of Aquitaine, and a victory for Charles the Bald and Louis the German. Hostilities dragged on for another two years until the Treaty of Verdun, which had a major influence on subsequent European history.

Although the battle is known to have been large, it was not well documented. Many historical sources are believed to have been destroyed after the war, leaving scant records from which to conjecture the numbers of combatants and casualties.

Background
Louis the Pious throughout his long reign had entreated to divide his empire meritoriously amongst his sons—all his sons—as it was required by the Salic Law of the Franks. With the late-born Charles, his attempts led to civil wars which culminated in his vindicating defeat of his last rebellious son, Louis, in 839. At Worms, on 30 May that year, he divided his empire for the last time, giving Lothair the kingdom he already held (Italy) and the imperial title, with all the other lands of the east and Charles receiving all the lands of the west. Louis was left with Bavaria while Pepin, his grandson, was left out of the inheritance.

On 24 July 840 in Strasbourg, Lothair precipitated a new civil war by declaring his imperium over all the lands of the empire and, joining with his nephew Pepin, attacked the Loire Valley. The barons of Burgundy divided over allegiance to Charles and Lothair. Ermenaud III of Auxerre, Arnoul of Sens, and Audri of Autun pledged themselves for Lothair, while Guerin of Provence and Aubert of Avallon remained with Charles. Girard II, Count of Paris, Lothair's brother-in-law, joined Lothair also. In March 841, the Burgundians faithful to Charles accompanied Guerin to join him and in May, Louis of Bavaria and his troops met Charles army at Châlons-sur-Marne. In June, Pepin finally joined with Lothair in Auxerre.

The battle
The two armies met on 25 June. According to tradition, Charles established his camp at Thury, on the hill of Roichat. Lothair and Pepin initiated battle and took the upper hand until the arrival of Guerin and his army of Provençals. While Pepin and his contingent continued to push back Charles' men, Lothair was slowly pushed back by Louis the German and the Provençals. Finally, when victory seemed sure for Charles, Bernard of Septimania entered the conflict on his side and the victory became a rout. According to Andreas Agnellus of Ravenna a total of 40,000 men died, including Gerard of Auvergne and Ricwin of Nantes, who fell at Charles' side.

"Neither dew nor showers nor rain ever fell again on that field where the most battle-hardened warriors had perished mourned by their mothers, their sisters, their brothers, and their friends. On Charles' side and Louis too, the fields were white with the linen habits of the dead as they might have been with birds in the autumn."

In spite of his personal gallantry, Lothair was defeated and fled to his capital of Aachen. With fresh troops he entered upon a war of plunder, but the forces of his brothers were too strong for him, and taking with him such treasure as he could collect, he abandoned to them his capital.

Angilbert's account

Verses by Angilbert, who fought the battle on the side of Lothar are cited by historian Eleanor Shipley Duckett as the "Most striking of all these Latin records of the battle".
The verses in English are...
Fontenoy they call its fountain, manor to the peasant known,
There the slaughter, there the ruin, of the blood of Frankish race;
Plains and forest shiver, shudder; horror wakes the silent marsh.

Neither dew nor shower nor rainfall yields its freshness to that field,
Where they fell, the strong men fighting, shrewdest in the battle's skill,
Father, mother, sister, brother, friends, the dead with tears have wept.

And this deed of crime accomplished, which I here in verse have told,
Angibert myself I witnessed, fighting with the other men,
I alone of all remaining, in the battle's foremost line.

On the side alike of Louis, on the side of Charles alike,
Lies the field in white enshrouded, in the vestments of the dead,
As it lies when birds in autumn settle white off the shore.

Woe unto that day of mourning! Never in the round of years
Be it numbered in men's annals! Be it banished from all mind,
Never gleam of sun shine on it, never dawn its dusk awake.

Night it was, a night most bitter, harder than we could endure,
When they fell, the brave men fighting, shrewdest in the battle's skill,
Father, mother, sister, brother, friends, the dead with tears have wept.

Now the wailing, the lamenting, now no longer will I tell;
Each, so far as in him lieth, let him stay his weeping now;
On their souls may He have mercy, let us pray the Lord of all.

See also
 Oath of Strasbourg (842)
 Treaty of Verdun (843)
 Angelbert
 Battle of Fontenoy (1745)

References

Sources
Initial text adapted from the entry for Lothair I in the 1911 Encyclopedia.

840s conflicts
841
9th century in France
Fontenoy 841
Fontenoy 841
History of Yonne